Sreegopal Banerjee College, also known as Bagati College, is one of the oldest colleges in Mogra, in the Hooghly district, West Bengal, India. It offers undergraduate courses in arts, commerce and sciences. It is affiliated to University of Burdwan.
It was established in 1958. The geographical location of the college is latitude 22°59' North and longitude 88°22' East. Its height from sea level is 38 feet (11.58 metres).

History
The college is named after the father of late Shib Chandra Banerjee, the well known civil engineer of all India repute who offered a munificent donation of land and cash to the West Bengal Government to enable the latter to establish a co-educational degree college under the "Sponsored" Scheme at his native village, Bagati. 

Bagati, the seat of the College, is located in an area that has a history of its own. Bagati is part of Saptagram - one of the oldest ports in India. The village itself is the native place of Ram Gopal Ghosh, the Demosthenes of Bengal. The scholar  Jagannath Tarkapanchanan lived in Tribeni within a mile from the site of the college. The stretch of land along the Ganga from Katwa to Bansberia, lying on the eastern fringe of Bagati, is the birthplace of Navya-Nyaya, the most powerful and brilliant school of Indian Logic & Pride of Indian Scholarship.

The college is located halfway between Tribeni and Magra, about a mile from both the railway stations on the Eastern Railway. The college is adjacent to old Trebeni-Tarkeswar rail line. It is also close to G.T. Road - India's oldest longest road and STKK road, locally called Assam Road. Therefore, easily approachable by roads, connected by buses. The village is surrounded by a vast industrial belt and presents a combination of peaceful rural charm with modern facilities.

The college at the outset was housed in the building of Ramgopal Ghosh High School, Bagati. It started functioning on 21 July 1958. It was shifted to the present three-storied building on 24 April 1959. 

The college has by now developed into one of the biggest institutions under the University of Burdwan. 

There are modern hostels for boys and girls within the campus. There is also a separate two storied building within the campus for the students' common room-cum-canteen.

With the mission of providing quality education, the college firmly believes that excellence of institutions of higher education is a function of many aspects of which self-evaluation and self-improvement are important.

Professor Baridbaran Ghosh, Sunil Khan, Harisadhan Dey Adhikary, taught there. Currently, Dr. Jhantu Das , Dr. Banhibaran Ghosh,Dr. Uttam Paul, Debashis Ray Chowdhury, Dr. Sudipta Chakraborty Dr Shubhrakanti Sinha Dr. Animesh Das and others are involved in teaching. There are now a total of 66 full-time professors in three shifts and 25 SACT's.

Departments

Science
 Chemistry
 Physics
 Mathematics
 Botany
 Zoology 
 Plant Protection

Arts and Commerce
 Bengali
 English
 Sanskrit
 History
 Political Science
 Philosophy
 Economics
 Physical Education
 Accountancy
 Business Studies

Accreditation
The college is recognized by the University Grants Commission (UGC). It was accredited by the National Assessment and Accreditation Council (NAAC), and awarded a B+ grade.

See also

References

External links
 Sreegopal Banerjee College

Universities and colleges in Hooghly district
Colleges affiliated to University of Burdwan
Educational institutions established in 1958
1958 establishments in West Bengal